Sandkrug station is a railway station in the municipality of Sandkrug, located in the Oldenburg district in Lower Saxony, Germany.

References

Railway stations in Lower Saxony
Buildings and structures in Oldenburg (district)